Turgis  is the largest known crater on Saturn's moon Iapetus. It is 580 km in diameter, 40% of the moon's diameter and one of the larger craters in the Solar System. It is named after a Saracen baron, Turgis of Turtelose (Tortosa).

The rim has a scarp about 15 km high that generated a landslide.
It is overlain by Malun, the 13th-largest crater on Iapetus.

Gallery

See also
List of geological features on Iapetus

References

Impact craters on Saturn's moons
Surface features of Iapetus (moon)